Rebecca Lucy Kitteridge  (born ) is a New Zealand public servant. Her current position is Deputy Public Service Commissioner.

She was Secretary of the Cabinet from 2008 to November 2013 and Director-General of the New Zealand Security Intelligence Service from 2014 to 2023.

Career 
Kitteridge attended Upper Hutt College, and is a graduate of Victoria University of Wellington. Her early career was in private legal practice before holding positions at the Crown Law Office, Cabinet Office and Ministry of Foreign Affairs and Trade. 

She was Deputy Secretary of the Cabinet from 2003 to 2008 and Secretary of the Cabinet from 2008 to November 2013. During the last six months of this time she was seconded to the GCSB as acting associate director-general to carry out a review of compliance systems and processes there, in response to concerns of illegal spying on Kim Dotcom.

She was appointed Director-General of the New Zealand Security Intelligence Service in 2014. She was the first woman to head the organisation. In 2022, it was announced she would join the State Services Commission as Deputy Public Service Commissioner.

Family 
Kitteridge has a husband and a daughter.

Honours 
On 25 March 2014, Kitteridge was appointed a Commander of the Royal Victorian Order upon relinquishing her roles as Secretary of the Cabinet and Clerk of the Executive Council, and was invested by the Queen in a private ceremony at Buckingham Palace. In 2017, Kitteridge won the Public Policy Award at the New Zealand Women of Influence Awards.

References

1960s births
Living people
New Zealand public servants
People educated at Upper Hutt College
Victoria University of Wellington alumni
New Zealand Commanders of the Royal Victorian Order
New Zealand Women of Influence Award recipients